The 1913 San Diego mayoral election was held on April 8, 1913 to elect the mayor for San Diego. Charles F. O'Neall and George Marston received the most votes in the primary election and advanced to the runoff. O'Neall was then elected mayor with a majority of the votes.

Candidates
Charles F. O'Neall, real estate agent
George Marston, department store owner
Jacob Beckel, President of the Federated Trades

Campaign
Incumbent Mayor James E. Wadham chose not to run for re-election to focus on his legal business and at the urging of his wife. Contestants for the open seat included Charles F. O'Neall, a Republican, George Marston, a Progressive running as a non-partisan candidate, and Jacob Beckel, a Socialist.

In the campaign, Marston emphasized projects that would lead to a beautiful and prosperous city, including harbor improvements, a new dry dock, a navy center and a railroad to Arizona. O'Neall emphasized the importance of developing commerce and industry over public parks and recreation.

On March 25, 1913, O'Neall and Marston received the two highest vote totals in the primary and advanced to the general election. O'Neall was then elected mayor on April 8, 1913 with a majority of the votes in the runoff.

Primary Election results

General Election results

References

1913
1913 California elections
1913
1913 United States mayoral elections
April 1913 events